AM404, also known as N-arachidonoylaminophenol, is an active metabolite of paracetamol (acetaminophen), responsible for all or part of its analgesic action and anticonvulsant effects. Chemically, it is the amide formed from 4-aminophenol and arachidonic acid.

Pharmacology 

It is established that AM404 increases concentrations of the endogenous cannabinoid anandamide within the synaptic cleft, contributing to its analgesic activity. This has been well characterised as involving endocannabinoid transporter inhibition, but the precise transporter responsible is yet to be determined. 

AM404 was originally reported to be an endogenous cannabinoid reuptake inhibitor, preventing the transport of anandamide and other related compounds back from the synaptic cleft, much in the same way that common selective serotonin reuptake inhibitor (SSRI) antidepressants prevent the reuptake of serotonin. Earlier work on the mechanism of AM404 suggested that the inhibition of fatty acid amide hydrolase (FAAH) by AM404 was responsible for all of its attributed reuptake properties, since intracellular FAAH hydrolysis of anandamide changes the intra/extracellular anandamide equilibrium. However, this is not the case, as newer research on FAAH knockout mice has found that brain cells internalize anandamide through a selective transport mechanism which is independent of FAAH activity. It is this mechanism which is inhibited by AM404.

AM404 is also a TRPV1 agonist and inhibitor of cyclooxygenase COX-1 and COX-2, thus attenuating prostaglandin synthesis. AM404 is thought to induce its analgesic action through its activity on the endocannabinoid, COX, and TRPV systems, all of which are present in pain and thermoregulatory pathways. AM404 activates vanilloid receptors causing vasodilation which is inhibited by the vanilloid receptor antagonist capsazepine.

The anticonvulsant action is mediated through CB1 receptors.

See also
 VDM-11 (2-methyl analogue)

References 

Anilides
Phenols
AM cannabinoids
Fatty acid amides
Human drug metabolites
Endocannabinoid reuptake inhibitors
Arachidonyl compounds